Markéta Veselá (born 28 December 1970) is a Czech architect.

Education 

Veselá was born in Brno, and attended Slovanske Namesti Grammar School in Brno in 1989. She studied architecture at Brno University of Technology, where she graduated in 1994. In 1995, she began postgraduate study at INEA in Rouen.

Career 

Between 1996 and 2000, Veselá worked in Brno's architectural studios. She founded the Maura Architectural Practice in February 2001.

Projects 

 The gate of time, Moravská Třebová (2013)
 Villa Sadova, Brno (2011)
 Garden Restaurant, Brno (2011)
 Kaskada Restaurant, Liberec (2010)
 Family house, Beroun (2010)
 Multi-use building, Kozi Street, Brno (2009)
 Building reconstruction, Slezska, Brno (2009)
 Reconstruction of a secondary school, Tr. Kpt. Jarose, Brno (2008)
 Development plan, Konopiste Resort (2008)
 Renovation of a family house, Troubsko (2007)
 Family house, Brno-Lesna (2007)
 Regeneration of concrete apartment blocks, Brno-Bystrc (2006)
 Apartment renovation, Ovenecka, Prague (2006)
 Family house, Modrice (2006)
 Minach Chocolate Cafe, Brno (2005)
 Reconstruction of HDO Headquarters, Zabreh (2004)
 Villa Nad Udolim, Prague-Hodkovicky (2003)
 Reconstruction of an apartment building, Skrivanova, Brno (2002)

Exhibitions 

KILL YOUR IDOL - Psychoanalysis of Contemporary Architecture of the City of Brno - 4AM Brno 2011, Czech and Slovak pavillon at the 13. International Architecture Exhibition of  2012, Kunstverein Leipzig 2013, 2009 - , Galerie Jaroslava Fragnera Praha 2009,  Berlin 2010

Bibliography 

 Maura 2001–2011, Brno 2012,

References

External links 
 Biography at Archiweb.cz

Czech architects
Living people
1970 births